Flight 315 may refer to:

Maritime Central Airways Flight 315, crashed on 11 August 1957
Aeroflot Flight 315 (1959), crashed on 16 November 1959
Aeroflot Flight 315 (1960), crashed on 26 February 1960

0315